Abitibi—Témiscamingue is a federal electoral district in Quebec, Canada, that has been represented in the House of Commons of Canada since 2004. The area was also represented by the electoral district of Témiscamingue from 1968 until 2004.

Geography
The district includes the Regional County Municipalities of Témiscamingue, Abitibi, Abitibi-Ouest, the city of Rouyn-Noranda and a small section of south western Jamésie territory.

The neighbouring ridings are Abitibi—Baie-James—Nunavik—Eeyou, Pontiac, Renfrew—Nipissing—Pembroke, Nipissing—Timiskaming, and Timmins—James Bay.

History
Témiscamingue was created in 1968 from parts of Pontiac—Témiscamingue and Villeneuve.

It was initially defined to consist of:
 the Cities of Noranda and Rouyn;
 the Towns of Belleterre, Temiscaming and Ville-Marie;
 the County of Témiscamingue (except the Townships of Béraud, Chabert, Darlens, Desroberts, Granet, Jourdan, Landanet, Laubanie, Marrias, Mazérac, Pélissier and Sabourin without local municipal organization).

In 1976, it was redefined to consist of:
 the Cities of Noranda and Rouyn;
 the Towns of Belleterre, Duparquet, La Sarre, Macamic, Temiscaming and Ville-Marie;
 the County of Témiscamingue; and
 parts of the County of Abitibi.

In 1987, it was redefined to consist of:
the towns of Belleterre, Duparquet, La Sarre, Macamic, Noranda, Rouyn, Témiscaming and Ville-Marie;
the County of Témiscamingue excluding the Territory of Témiscamingue-Lac-Granet portion;
 parts of the County of Abitibi; and
 the southwest part of the Municipality of James Bay.

It was renamed "Rouyn-Noranda—Témiscamingue" in 1996, and redefined to consist of:
 the cities of Belleterre, Cadillac, Duparquet, La Sarre, Macamic, Rouyn-Noranda, Témiscaming and Ville-Marie;
 the county regional municipalities of Abitibi-Ouest and Rouyn-Noranda;
 the County Regional Municipality of Témiscamingue, including Timiscaming Indian Reserve No. 19 and Eagle Village First Nation-Kipawa Indian Reserve, the Indian settlements of Hunter's Point and Winneway; and
 the southwest part of the Municipality of James Bay.

In 1997, it was renamed "Témiscamingue".

The electoral district was abolished in 2003 when it was merged into Abitibi—Témiscamingue.

Abitibi—Témiscamingue was created in 2003. 77.1% came from Témiscamingue, and 22.9% from neighbouring Abitibi—Baie-James—Nunavik riding.

The riding lost a small territory to Abitibi—Baie-James—Nunavik—Eeyou as a result of the 2012 electoral redistribution.

Members of Parliament

This riding has elected the following members of the House of Commons of Canada:

Election results

Abitibi—Témiscamingue, 2004–present 

|align="left" colspan=2|New Democratic Party gain from Bloc Québécois
|align="right"|Swing
|align="right"| +29.0
|align="right"|

|-

Témiscamingue, 1968–2004
By-election: On Mr. Brien's resignation, 14 March 2003:

By-election: On Mr. Réal Caouette's death, 16 December 1976

See also
 List of Canadian federal electoral districts
 Past Canadian electoral districts

References

Elections Canada 2011 results
Riding history from the Library of Parliament
(1966 - 1996)
(1996 - 1997)
(1997 - 2003)
Campaign expense data from Elections Canada

Notes

Quebec federal electoral districts
Amos, Quebec
Rouyn-Noranda